Canaccord Genuity Group Inc. is a global, full-service investment banking and financial services company that specializes in wealth management and brokerage in capital markets. It is the largest independent investment dealer in Canada. The firm focuses on growth companies, with operations in 10 countries worldwide and the ability to list companies on 10 stock exchanges. Canaccord Genuity, the international capital markets division, is based in Canada, with offices in the US, the UK, France, Germany, Ireland, Hong Kong, China, Singapore, Dubai, Australia, and Barbados.

Canaccord Genuity provides mergers and acquisitions, corporate finance, restructuring, debt advisory, and strategic advice for corporate, government, and private-equity clients globally. The firm's practice areas include aerospace and defense, agriculture, clean technology and sustainability, consumer and retail, energy,  financials, health care, and life sciences, infrastructure, leisure, media and telecommunications, metals and mining, real estate and hospitality, technology, transportation, and private equity.

History

1950 Hemsworth, Turton & Co. Founded
The company was established in 1950 as Hemsworth, Turton & Co., a Western Canadian venture capital firm.

2004 Canaccord Capital IPO to 2009
In 2004 Canaccord Capital went public on the Toronto Stock Exchange with an IPO price of $10.25 and an initial purchase offering of $ 70-million.

In 2006 Canaccord Capital purchased Adams, Harkness & Hill Financial Group Inc., a Boston-based investment dealer.  The firm's global capital markets division is rebranded by Canaccord Adams.

In 2009 Canaccord Capital was renamed Canaccord Financial.

2010 Canaccord Financial acquired Genuity Capital Markets
In 2010, Canaccord Financial acquired Genuity Capital Markets in a cash and share deal worth about $286 million. Genuity Capital Markets, founded in 2005, had 135 employees with offices in Canada and the U.S. and was a leader in independent advisory and restructuring in Canada.

2012 UK Expansion through Acquisition
In 2012, Canaccord Financial acquired Collins Stewart Hawkpoint for $400m acquiring "an independent financial advisory firm with research, trading and wealth management operations."

In 2012 Canaccord Financial acquired Eden Financial, a London-based wealth management business for private client investment management.

2013 Canaccord Financial was renamed Canaccord Genuity Wealth Management 
2013 Canaccord Financial rebrands its global wealth management division to Canaccord Genuity Wealth Management.

2017 Canaccord Genuity Group Inc. announced the complete acquisition of Hargreave Hale Lt

2019 Canaccord Genuity acquires Petsky Prunier

2019 Canaccord Genuity acquires Patersons Securities Limited

2021 Canaccord Genuity acquires the investment management business of Adam & Company

2021 Canaccord Genuity acquires Sawaya Partners

2022 Canaccord Genuity acquires Punter Southall Wealth Limited

Business divisions
The two units of Canaccord Genuity are "wealth management, catering to well-heeled individuals, and Global Capital Markets, serving corporate and institutional clients."

Canaccord Genuity Wealth Management
Canaccord Genuity Wealth Management's total client assets amounted to $96.1 billion in Canada, the UK & Europe, and Australia on March 31, 2022. Canaccord Genuity Wealth Management and Credit Suisse Asset Management Partnership: In April 2016, Canaccord Genuity Wealth Management announced a strategic partnership with Credit Suisse Asset Management (CSAM).

Canaccord Genuity Global Capital Markets
Includes (1) Investment Banking - M&A, Corporate Finance, Restructuring, Debt Advisory, Strategic Advice (2) Research, (3) Sales and Trading, and (4) Fixed Income.

Transactions History
Landmark transactions have included advising Amaya Gaming Group in its $4.9 billion acquisition of PokerStars and Full Tilt Poker, advising Yamana Gold's $3.9 billion joint acquisition with Agnico Eagle of Osisko Mining, advising Primaris REIT's hostile defense and $5.0 billion sale to H&R REIT and KingSett Capital led consortium, advising Viterra's $6.1 billion sale to Glencore, and advising  the $2.2 billion cross-border sale of Daylight Energy to Sinopec, a unit of China Petrochemical Corp. It has also advised on GLENTEL's $670 million sale to Bell Canada in 2014, and the sale of Canada Goose to Bain Capital. In 2012, it advised on Extorre Gold Mines' $404 million sale to Yamana Gold.

In 2013, the Canaccord Genuity team put together a consortium of major investors, including Schroders and Threadneedle Investments, in participating in a takeover bid proposal for 316 bank branches of the Royal Bank of Scotland (RBS). Two buyout firms, Apollo Management and JC Flowers, also submitted a joint offer. In 2011, the firm advised the $3.2 billion sale of Converteam from Barclays Private Equity and LBO France to General Electric, growing the GE Power Conversion business. In the same year, Canaccord Genuity also advised the Bank of Ireland on the disposal of a c.£1.3bn UK commercial real-estate loan book to California-based Kennedy Wilson and institutional partners for consideration of c.£1.07bn, over 80% of par value despite both the poor UK commercial real estate and lending market conditions at the time.

As for restructuring mandates, Canaccord Genuity advised Yellow Media on its $2.7 billion debt recapitalization in 2012.

Leadership
Some of Genuity's former partners and current executives include:
 David J. Kassie (former Chairman and CEO of CIBC World Markets and founder of Genuity Capital Markets)
 Daniel Daviau (former Head of Investment Banking at CIBC World Markets and founding member of Genuity Capital Markets)

References

Companies listed on the Toronto Stock Exchange
Banks of Canada
Banks established in 1950
Financial services companies established in 1950
Companies based in Vancouver
Investment management companies of Canada